Shanshang or variation, may refer to:

 Shanshang District, Tainan, Taiwan
 Shanshang Subdialect, see Danzhou dialect

See also

 Shang (disambiguation)
 Shan (disambiguation)
 Shanshan (disambiguation)
 Shangshan (disambiguation)
 Sanjo (disambiguation) 
 Sanjō Station (disambiguation)
 Yamanoue (disambiguation) 
 Yamagami (disambiguation)